Banchory is a burgh or town in Aberdeenshire, Scotland.

Prehistory and archaeology 
In 2009, a farmer discovered a short cist burial to the east of the town. Archaeologists were called into excavate it and they found that it was a burial from the Beaker culture. Radiocarbon dating put the burial at sometime between 2330 and 2040 BC. Stable isotope analysis of the human remains indicated that he or she grew up on basalt geology, like that of the region, or on chalk, meaning they were either local or could have come from another place, like Yorkshire. Residue analysis of the Beaker pot found in the burial established that it had held either butter or milk.

History 
The name is thought to be derived from an early Christian settlement founded by St Ternan. It is claimed that Ternan was a follower of St Ninian. Tradition has it that he established his settlement on the banks of the River Dee on what was later to become the kirkyard of the medieval parish of Banchory-Ternan. The village and parish retained the name until the 1970s. The original Gaelic form is almost identical to that of Bangor, of similar meaning, and also the site of a monastery, in Northern Ireland.  Relics associated with St. Ternan were preserved by hereditary keepers at Banchory until the Scottish Reformation.  Two early Christian cross-slabs survive in or near the old churchyard on the site of the early church.  One is built into a corner of the 'mort house' in the churchyard, and shows two crosses incised in a worn pink granite slab.  The other is a ringed cross in relief built into the wall facing the main road outside the churchyard.

Overview 

Banchory is the largest town in the area and has a High Street. There are a number of hotels and restaurants including the Stag Hotel, Scott Skinners Bar and Restaurant, the Burnett Arms, and the Douglas Arms. The shops include newsagents, hairdressers and chemists. Since the 1970s, the town has grown steadily. Since 2001 there has been rapid expansion. A large forested area 'the Hill of Banchory', owned by the Burnett family (owners of Crathes Castle), to the north east of the town has been replaced by a large housing estate and an influx of new residents. The Hill of Banchory primary school was opened in 2006 to cater for the increased population.

Banchory Town Hall was completed in 1873 and the Kinneskie Road drill hall was completed in around 1908.

Land use 
Banchory Academy is a state secondary school, with a school roll capacity of 900.

The Banchory Sports Village opened in 2019 within the Hill of Banchory development area, with a 25m 6-lane swimming pool, gym and sports hall.

Tourism and culture 

Banchory is known as the Gateway to Royal Deeside. Banchory River Festival is held every June: the main event is held on the Saturday in the Bellfield Park, Banchory. The Banchory show is held every July: there is an Agricultural Show, Dog Show, Craft Fair, Highland Dancing Competition and the Scolty Hill Race, as well as traditional fairground stalls and games.

Scotland's only Rum distillery, Dark Matter Distillers, is located on the outskirts of Banchory.

Transportation 
In 2017, the Banchory town service 205 was withdrawn. An internal bus was re-introduced in 2020. The town is on the Deeside Way, a shared pedestrian and cycle path which runs along the trackbed of the former Deeside Railway.

Notable people
Sir John Macqueen Cowan (1891–1960), botanist
James Scott Skinner (1843–1927), fiddler and composer
Caroline Phillips (1874–1956), Scottish suffragette and journalist, who owned Banchory Station Hotel 1912 to 1940s
Pete Cashmore (born 1985), founder of technology blog Mashable
Ben Kilner (born 1988), snowboarder, Winter Olympian
Norman Douglas (1868–1952), Scottish novelist and travel writer
Andrew Considine (born 1987), footballer for St Johnstone F.C.

See also
 Banchory Ternan East Parish Church
 Cluny Crichton Castle, a ruined tower house just north of Banchory.
 Glen O'Dee Hospital

References

External links 

 Visit Banchory – Gateway to Royal Deeside
 Banchory Community Website
Banchory information guide for visitors
Banchory Community Football Club

 
Towns in Aberdeenshire